Deer Park railway station is located on the Serviceton line in Victoria, Australia. It serves the western Melbourne suburb of Deer Park, and it opened on 2 April 1884 as Kororoit. It was renamed Deer Park on 3 December 1889.

History

Deer Park station opened as Kororoit on 2 April 1884, along with the Serviceton line, and was renamed Deer Park in 1899, by which time the station had a three road yard, passenger platform on the southern track, a goods platform on the northern track, and an interlocked signal box. Being on a single track railway, it served as a crossing loop for trains, which remained until 1913, when the signal box was abolished.

In 1928, a siding serving Nobel Chemical Finishes (Australia) Pty Ltd was provided at the Up (Spencer Street) end of the station, running north to a loop siding and dead end. In 1929, alterations were made to the electric staff working of trains, to permit workers trains to operate to the Nobel factories at Ardeer and Deer Park. In 1943, the signal box was reopened, in conjunction with the opening of the new Ravenhall siding (Commonwealth Government Siding), at the Down end of the yard. The new siding ran south from the line to a loop siding, before terminating at a dead end. Also in that year, flashing lights were provided at the Mount Derrimut Road level crossing (then known as Station Road), located at the Up end of the station.

The Nobel siding (later ICIANZ) was closed in 1955 and, in 1976, the line from Sunshine to Deer Park West Junction was duplicated, with the current island platform also provided. The signal box was closed, and the line was worked by Centralised Traffic Control from Sunshine. Crossovers between both lines were provided at each end of the platform. In 1978, the Ravenhall siding was abolished.

In 1981, boom barriers were provided at the Mount Derrimut Road level crossing. In 1987, one of the loop sidings in the yard was removed, with the last siding removed in 1989, leaving only the main line and platform. In 2005, as part of the Regional Fast Rail project, control of the signalling was transferred to the Ballarat signal box.

In September 2009, an upgrade of Deer Park station commenced, including:
 150 paved car parking spaces;
 improved station access, lighting and signage;
 improved station security via CCTV;
 retain as many trees as possible, as well as planting new trees;
 protect native grasses to the east of the new car park.

In June 2015, the junction of the Deer Park – West Werribee line, part of the Regional Rail Link project, opened three kilometres west of Deer Park. The year prior, during major construction works, the station underwent a minor upgrade as part of the project. There were changes to the platform and the car-park, and safety fences were installed between the tracks and the carpark waiting area.

First announced by the Andrews State Government in 2018, the station is set to be integrated into the metropolitan railway network, as part of the Western Rail Plan.

As part of the Regional Rail Revival project, 18km of track was duplicated between Deer Park West and Melton. It was provided in late 2019, coinciding with the opening of Cobblebank.

As part of the Level Crossing Removal Project, the Mount Derrimut Road level crossing will be grade separated and the station rebuilt. The railway line will be elevated over the road, along with the rebuilt station. Construction began in 2021, and works are due to be completed in 2024.

Platforms and services

Deer Park has one island platform with two faces. It is serviced by V/Line Ballarat, Ararat and Geelong line services, as well as selected weekend Warrnambool line services.

Platform 1:
  services to Southern Cross
  services to Southern Cross
  services to Southern Cross
  two weekend services to Southern Cross

Platform 2:
  services to Melton, Bacchus Marsh and Wendouree
  services to Ararat
  services to Wyndham Vale, Geelong and Waurn Ponds

Transport links

CDC Melbourne operates one route via Deer Park station, under contract to Public Transport Victoria:
 : Sunshine station – Laverton station (shared with Transit Systems Victoria)

Transit Systems Victoria operates three routes via Deer Park station, under contract to Public Transport Victoria:
 : Sunshine station – Laverton station (shared with CDC Melbourne)
 : Sunshine station – Watergardens station
 : Sunshine station – Brimbank Central Shopping Centre

Gallery

References

External links
 
 Victorian Railway Stations gallery
 Melway map at street-directory.com.au

Railway stations in Melbourne
Railway stations in Australia opened in 1884
Railway stations in the City of Brimbank